Oregon Ballot Measure 89 was a ballot measure in the U.S. state of Oregon to determine whether or not to enact a "constitutional amendment specifically barring discrimination based on gender, a state version of the Equal Rights Amendment for women's rights once proposed for the U.S. Constitution".
Measure 89 passed with about 64% of votes statewide, gaining most of its support in 24 of the 36 counties.

Results

See also
 Gender inequality in the United States

References

Gender equality
2014 Oregon ballot measures